Goalball at the 2008 Summer Paralympics was held in the Beijing Institute of Technology Gymnasium from September 7 to September 14. The competition consisted of men's and women's team events, and what had been billed as one of the most open tournaments certainly lived up to expectations.

In the women's gold medal game, the lead changed hands five times, with the USA outlasting China by a score of 6–5, with never more than one goal in it. The winning goal came from Asya Miller with less than a minute to go.

The gold medal in the men's game was even more dramatic. Lithuania, the current world champions, took advantage of a clutch of penalties in the first half to jump ahead of China by 6 goals to 2 at the half, and looked to be holding on despite a steady comeback. With only 50 seconds on the clock, the Chinese were two goals behind (6–8) but managed to overturn the deficit with three goals in 30 seconds to take the gold 9–8, sending the packed BIT Gymnasium into rapture.

Medalists

Classification
Players are given a classification depending on the type and extent of their disability. Visually impaired athletes in classes B1 through B3 can take part in goalball. Partially sighted players wear blindfolds so that they compete on equal terms with blind players.

Participating teams
There were 12 men's teams and 8 women's teams taking part in this sport.

Men's

Women's

Men's

Competition format
The twelve men's teams were divided into two even groups for a single round robin group stage. The top four teams of each group will advance to the quarter finals to compete for 1st through 8th place, while the last two teams of each group compete for 9th through 12th place. All matches in the second stage are knock-out format.

Group stage

Group A

Group B

Tournament bracket

Classification rounds

2008-09-12 11/12th classification

2008-09-13 5-8th classification

2008-09-14 7/8th classification

5/6th classification

Women's

Competition format
The eight women's teams will play a single round robin tournament. The top four teams advance to the semi-final to compete for 1st through 4th place.

Preliminary stage

Tournament bracket 

China-Sweden PSC

References

External links
Official site of the 2008 Summer Paralympics
The Audio Sports Network produced live audio broadcasts of every game of the tournament, and you can listen to the free mp3 audio archive by clicking on this link

2008
2008 Summer Paralympics events
Goalball in China